Donghua University (DHU) is a public research university in Shanghai, China. "Donghua" literally means East China. Established in 1951, it is directly administered by the Ministry of Education of China as part of the Double First Class University Plan and former Project 211 for National Key Universities. It is best known for its research and education in engineering, management, design and materials science disciplines. 

As of 2021, Donghua University is ranked among the world top 800th universities according to some of the most-widely read university rankings in the world such as the Academic Ranking of World Universities, the Times Higher Education World University Rankings, and the U.S. News & World Report Best Global University Ranking. It is ranked as the top 1 school for Textile Engineering, Fiber Materials Science, and Fashion Design in China in the recognized Best Chinese Universities Ranking.

History
Founded in June 1951, Donghua University was originally named the East China Institute of Textile Technology. In September 1985, the institute changed its name to China Textile University and changed it once again to Donghua University in August 1999. The word "Donghua" literally means East China.

It has been a national key university since 1960 and was one of the educational institutions in China authorized to confer all three levels of degree: bachelor's, master's, and doctorate degrees.

Campuses
Donghua University has two campuses: one in Changning District and the other in Songjiang District in Shanghai. Most bachelor courses are taken in Songjiang district.

International engagement 
Being well known as an international university; ranking top 5 in the list of most international-friendly universities in China. Being amongst the first Chinese universities to accept international students, Donghua University is no stranger to the needs of international students like Shanghai Summer School participants. To date, Donghua University has hosted international students from almost 140 countries.

References

 
Universities and colleges in Shanghai
Plan 111
Educational institutions established in 1951
1951 establishments in China